"House" is the second single by American punk band Babes in Toyland. Released by Sub Pop Records and limited to 3,500 copies, 1,500 were released on black vinyl for the Sub Pop Singles Club, and the remaining 2,000 on special gold (yellow) vinyl. This is the band's first non-album single. It features the b-side "Arriba."

Track listing

Personnel
Musicians
Kat Bjellandvocals, guitar
Michelle Leonbass
Lori Barberodrums

Technical
Jack Endinoproduction, recording
Carol Hibbsmastering
Tom Robinsonphotography (back)
Charles Petersonphotography (front)

References

1990 singles
Babes in Toyland (band) songs
1990 songs
Songs written by Kat Bjelland